MUV may refer to:

Science and technology
 MUV (radiation) (middle ultraviolet), a form of electromagnetic radiation
 Mumps virus (MuV), the virus that causes mumps
 MUV Interactive, the developer of Bird (technology)

Transportation
 Military light utility vehicle, a military vehicle classification, also known as a military utility vehicle (MUV)
 Minivan, a passenger vehicle classification, also known as a multi utility vehicle (MUV)
 Compact MUV, an MUV classification

See also
 Muv-Luv, a 2003 Japanese erotic visual novel